Route 70, also known as Roaches Line and Conception Bay Highway, is a  north-south highway on the Avalon Peninsula of Newfoundland. The highway also carries the designation of Baccalieu Trail for its entire length.

Route description

Route 70 begins in Roaches Line at an interchange with Route 75 (Veterans Memorial Highway), just a short distance north of Route 1 (Trans Canada Highway). It heads north through rural wooded to come enter Cupids, where it has an intersection with Route 60 (Conception Bay Highway) and Route 71 (Hodgewater Line), where Route 70 takes on the name Conception Bay Highway from Route 60. The highway begins following the coastline as it passes through South River, Clarke's Beach, and  North River before passing through Bay Roberts, where it has an intersection with Route 72 (Port de Grave Road). Route 70 now passes through Spaniard's Bay and Tilton, where it has an intersection with Route 73 (Back Track Road), before winding its way through hilly terrain to pass through Harbour Grace. The highway now travels more inland as it meets the northern end of Route 75 (Veterans Memorial Highway) before bypassing Carbonear along its west side. Route 70 now passes through Victoria, where it makes a sharp right at an intersection with Route 74 (Heart's Content Highway), to turn east and pass through Salmon Cove. It now follows the coastline again and very windy as it passes through Perry's Cove, Kingston, Small Point-Adam's Cove-Blackhead-Broad Cove, Western Bay, Ochre Pit Cove, Northern Bay, Gull Island, Burnt Point, Job's Cove, Lower Island Cove, and Caplin Cove. The highway now turns inland again through grasslands to enter Old Perlican and have an intersection with Route 80 (Trinity Road/Blow Me Down Road). Route 70 turns east through rural areas for several kilometres to have intersections with Grates Cove Road and Red Head Cove Road before entering Bay de Verde along Main Road. It winds its way south through town to come to an end at Bay de Verde's harbour.

Major intersections

References

070